Eumops chiribaya is a species of free-tailed bat found in Peru.

Taxonomy
Eumops chiribaya was described as a new species in 2014 by Medina et al. The holotype had been collected in 2010 in El Algarrobal, Peru. Its species name "chiribaya" refers to the Chiribayans, who were indigenous Peruvians.

Description
Eumops chiribaya is considered a medium-sized member of its genus.

Range and habitat
Eumops chiribaya is endemic to Peru. It has been documented in the type locality of El Algarrobal as well as the Ocoña Valley in the Department of Arequipa.

References

Mammals described in 2014
Eumops
Bats of South America